Juan Miguel "Juanmi" Latasa Fernández Layos (born 23 March 2001), is a Spanish footballer who plays as a forward for La Liga club Getafe, on loan from Real Madrid.

Club career
Latasa made his debut for Real Madrid in a 1–1 draw with Cádiz on 15 May 2022.

On 26 August 2022, Latasa joined Getafe on a season long loan.

Career statistics

Club

References

2001 births
Living people
Footballers from Madrid
Spanish footballers
Spain youth international footballers
Association football forwards
Segunda División B players
Primera Federación players
La Liga players
Real Madrid Castilla footballers
Real Madrid CF players
Getafe CF footballers